The MK3 hand grenade is a cylindrical concussion grenade designed to produce casualties during close combat while minimizing danger to friendly personnel exposed in the open owing to minimal fragmentation. There is a secondary fragmentation hazard though from rocks, gravel, wood splinters, glass, etc. The grenade is also used for concussion effects in enclosed areas, for blasting, or for demolition tasks. The shock waves (overpressure) produced by this grenade when used in enclosed areas are greater than those produced by the fragmentation grenade. It is, therefore, very effective used in an offensive role against enemy soldiers located in bunkers, buildings, and fortified areas. It is commonly known as the "concussion" or "demo" (from demolition) grenade.

The first version was created in March, 1918. It was designed to be used during trench assaults to knock out bunkers and clear trenches without producing fragmentation that could injure the user or friendly forces nearby.

There are three variants: the basic MK3, the MK3A1, and the MK3A2. They differ in their construction and the type of fuse used. They were designated Mk III (Roman numbers) prior to 2 April 1945.

MK3 (Mk.III offensive blast grenade) [1918]

The MK3 has a cardboard body and crimped metal top and bottom. The top has a raised fuze well that was threaded for a fuze assembly. It used the reliable Mk.II fuze, which used a Mills-bomb style striker but with a straight lever. It was replaced by the MK3A1.

It can be identified by its black body with yellow markings.

MK3A1 (Mk.III A1 offensive grenade)

The MK3A1 had a water-resistant laminated-paper body and top and bottom caps made from die-cast metal. The top had a threaded fuze well in the center. It originally used the M6A1 fuse, which had a four to five second delay. It was upgraded to the M6A2, and then the M6A3 fuze sometime in the early 1940s and the M6A4D fuze in 1944. The grenade contained 7 ounces [0.20 kg.] of flaked TNT filler.

It can be identified by its black body and a yellow band pasted across the middle marked "Grenade, Hand - Offensive MK.III A1" in black lettering. It differs from the MK3 in having a fuze well that is flush with the surface of the top cap.

The grenades weighed 0.69 lbs. each. The MK3, like all TNT-filled grenades and bombs, were shipped without their fuzes as a safety measure. They were packed in cardboard storage tubes in crates of 24 or 50. Fuzes were shipped separately in boxes containing 25 fuzes.

MK3A2

The MK3A2 had a waterproof asphalt-impregnated fiberboard cylinder and its top and bottom were made from the same material. The top had a fuze well directly threaded in its center. It originally used the M6A4D fuze, which had a four to five second delay. This was later replaced with the updated M206 series fuze (currently using the M206A2), which was smokeless— and noiseless—burning and had a five-second delay. It contained an 8 oz. TNT charge.

It can be identified by its cylinder, which is in two halves and is secured in the middle with a wide black band. The yellow lettering is printed directly on the surface of the grenade and reads "Grenade Hand - Offensive MK3A2 - TNT".

The grenades weighed 0.96 lbs. each. They came packed in storage tubes in crates of 30 grenades.

References

 FM 3-23.30 "Grenades and Pyrotechnic Signals". globalsecurity.org, 1 September 2000. Ch. 1, Sec. 1-8.b "Special-Purpose Hand Grenades/Offensive". Retrieved on 26 May 2011

Concussion grenades
Hand grenades of the United States
World War I infantry weapons of the United States
World War II infantry weapons of the United States